Richard Ray Massie (born January 16, 1960) is a former American football wide receiver. He played for the Calgary Stampeders in 1984 and for the Denver Broncos from 1987 to 1988.

References

1960 births
Living people
American football wide receivers
Kentucky Wildcats football players
Calgary Stampeders players
Denver Broncos players
People from Paris, Kentucky